Marius Mihai Marin (born 30 August 1998) is a Romanian professional footballer who plays as a midfielder for Serie B club Pisa and the Romania national team.

Marin moved to Italy at age 18, when Sassuolo transferred him from hometown side ASU Politehnica Timișoara. After three years under contract with the Neroverdi, during which he was loaned out to Catanzaro and Pisa, he decided to sign for the latter club on a permanent basis.

Internationally, Marin represented Romania at under-21 and under-23 levels, before making his full debut in a 2–0 win over Liechtenstein in September 2021.

Club career

Early career
ACS Poli Timișoara head coach Dan Alexa handed Marin his senior debut on 23 May 2015, aged 16, in a 5–0 thrashing of Unirea Tărlungeni in the Liga II championship. The following season, Marin moved to ASU Politehnica Timișoara—the other club founded after the dissolution of the original FC Politehnica—and participated with it in the third league, which they went on win.

In late August 2016, Marin transferred abroad to Sassuolo after having trained in Italy for one month. He signed a four-year contract after turning 18 and spent his first season with the Primavera side. For the 2017–18 campaign, he agreed to a loan deal with Catanzaro in the Serie C.

Pisa
Marin was again loaned out by Sassuolo for the 2018–19 season, joining Pisa with which he achieved promotion to the Serie B. On 31 July 2019, he returned to the Arena Garibaldi on a full transfer. Marin scored his first career goal on 3 July 2020, in a 2–0 league win over Cittadella. 

During early 2021, it was reported that several teams from the Serie A were monitoring Marin, as well as two of the title contenders from his native country—CFR Cluj and FCSB. Nothing came of it however, and on 20 October 2021 he signed a contract extension with Pisa which would run until 2025.

On 28 August 2022, Marin made his 100th Serie B appearance and also wore the captain armband in a 0–1 loss to Genoa.

International career
Marin registered his debut for Romania under-21 on 10 October 2019, in a 3–0 win over Ukraine counting for the 2021 UEFA European Championship qualifiers; he received a red card just one minute after entering the field. Manager Adrian Mutu called up Marin for the final tournament hosted by Hungary and Slovenia, and he captained the side in the first two group games before missing the last one through a suspension. Romania failed to progress despite finishing with the same number of points as the Netherlands and Germany.

Marin was then named in the squad for the postponed 2020 Summer Olympics, where he continued to serve as captain and played all three matches in the eventual group-stage exit. He made his full debut for Romania on 5 September 2021, coming on as a 63rd-minute substitute for Darius Olaru in a 2–0 World Cup qualifier defeat of Liechtenstein.

Personal life
Marin stated that his parents struggled financially in order for him to practise youth football, so he used the first money he earned in Italy to build a house for them.

Career statistics

Club

International

Honours
ACS Poli Timișoara
Liga II: 2014–15
ASU Politehnica Timișoara
Liga III: 2015–16

References

External links

1998 births
Living people
Sportspeople from Timișoara
Romanian footballers
Association football midfielders
Liga II players
Liga III players
ACS Poli Timișoara players
SSU Politehnica Timișoara players
Serie B players
Serie C players
U.S. Sassuolo Calcio players
U.S. Catanzaro 1929 players
Pisa S.C. players
Romania under-21 international footballers
Olympic footballers of Romania
Footballers at the 2020 Summer Olympics
Romania international footballers
Romanian expatriate footballers
Expatriate footballers in Italy
Romanian expatriate sportspeople in Italy